Asiri Bandara (born 1 December 1991) is a Sri Lankan cricketer. He made his List A debut for Hambantota District in the 2016–17 Districts One Day Tournament on 17 March 2017.

References

External links
 

1991 births
Living people
Sri Lankan cricketers
Hambantota District cricketers
People from Badulla